Typhoon Haikui was the third tropical cyclone in the span of a week to impact Mainland China during late July and early August 2012. The name Haikui, which replaces Longwang, means sea anemone in Chinese.

Meteorological history

Late on July 31, a tropical disturbance formed within a large monsoon trough. On August 1, the Japan Meteorological Agency (JMA) mentioned the system as a tropical depression southeast of Iwo Jima, and the Joint Typhoon Warning Center (JTWC) issued a Tropical Cyclone Formation Alert late on the same day. Late on August 2, the JTWC upgraded it to a tropical depression, before the JMA upgraded the system to a tropical storm and named it Haikui early on the next day. Early on August 4, the JTWC upgraded Haikui to a tropical storm. On August 5, the JMA upgraded Haikui to a severe tropical storm when it was located north-northeast of Kume Island. The JTWC upgraded Haikui to a category 1 typhoon Late on August 6, as it developed an eye. At 12Z on August 7, the JMA upgraded Haikui to a typhoon, but the JTWC downgraded it to a tropical storm simultaneously. Later, Typhoon Haikui made landfall over Xiangshan County in Zhejiang, China at 19:20 UTC (03:20 CST on August 8).

Preparations and impact

Philippines

Although located hundreds of kilometres away from the Philippines, the southerly flow from Typhoon Haikui enhanced the southwest monsoon across much of Luzon. As a result, widespread heavy rains impacted regions still recovering from deadly floods triggered by Typhoon Saola less than a week earlier. During a 72‑hour span from 6–8 August,  of rain fell in parts of Metro Manila, leading local media to compare the event to Typhoon Ketsana in 2009, which killed 464 in the city. Some of the most severe flooding took place along the Marikina River, which swelled to near-record levels. About 70 percent of Metro Manila  were affected by flooding. Due to the expanding floods, officials in the city evacuated more than 23,000 residents from flood-prone areas and relocated them to shelters set up across the area. According to a reporter from the British Broadcasting Corporation, many residents were reluctant to leave their belongings behind, and some traveled back through flood waters to retrieve their belongings. Officials feared the flooding could worsen as the La Mesa Dam continued to overflow by then. At least nine people were killed and four others were injured in a landslide in Quezon City.

Numerous schools in Metro Manila, Central Luzon, and Calabarzon had suspended classes. As a precautionary measure, officials cut power to some areas of National Capital Region (NCR). At least 250,000 people left their homes as flooding covered more than a third of the city. The head of the National Disaster Risk Reduction and Management Council (NDRRMC) compared the deluge to the Kevin Costner film Waterworld.

In response to the flooding, the NDRRMC allocated approximately  worth of relief funds and deployed 202 personnel to assist in search and rescue missions. The search and rescue missions were hampered by strong currents in flooded streets. Philippine President Benigno Aquino ordered officials to maximize the effort on rescuing and aiding affected residents.

On 8 August, more than 1 million families were already affected. The NCR and nine nearby provinces were already placed under a state of calamity, with some areas were flooded up to 2 storeys. 90 percent of Metro Manila were already submerged in flooding. Communications were affected badly, though distress calls and SMS from thousands of Metro Manila residents and their worried relatives flooded television and radio stations as most power and water connections were lost. Red warning was already downed to yellow during morning but turned back into red warning during afternoon after another set of continuous heavy rain falls again in Metro Manila until midnight of August 9, 2012. Some schools extended their suspension of classes until Saturday. Airports also had severe flooding, forcing some flights to land at Clark International Airport in Pampanga and other airports nationwide or altogether rebooking.

Throughout the Philippines, a total of 112 people have been confirmed dead and 14 people were injured. In terms of damage, a total of 14,280 homes were damaged, of which 3,871 were totally destroyed. Economic losses were totalled at ₱3.18 billion (US$76.3 million), in which most of them were agricultural loss.

Japan

Slowly moving through the Ryukyu Islands for several days, Haikui brought a prolonged period of heavy rain and high winds to several islands. No reports of major damage were received on Okinawa, though numerous tree limbs were downed across the island. A total of 353 flights to and from Naha International Airport were canceled, affecting more than 70,000 passengers.

China

On August 7, officials in Shanghai closed all parks, banned outdoor activities, canceled summer classes, and suspended outdoor construction. At least 200,000 in the city alone were evacuated and another 256,000 were relocated in neighboring Zhejiang Province. Port officials also called 30,000 ships back to shore to ride out the storm. Throughout the country, an estimated one million people were evacuated ahead of the storm's arrival. In Anhui Province, officials temporarily closed access to the Huangshan mountain range, a UNESCO World Heritage Site. Approximately 19,000 people in the area were also evacuated due to the threat of high winds and heavy rain.

Across Zhejiang Province, Haikui caused widespread and severe damage. According to the local flood and drought relief headquarters, 4,452 homes were destroyed and 184,800 hectares were submerged in flood waters. In Sanmen County, where the storm made landfall, nearly 100 villages lost power. In the province alone, economic losses were estimated in excess of ¥10 billion (US$1.57 billion). Additionally, an estimated 4.03 million people were affected by the storm. In Shanghai, two people were killed and seven others were injured in storm-related accidents. On the morning of August 10, the Shenjiakeng Reservoir in Zhoushan collapsed, flooding the surrounding area and killing at least ten people. Local officials "vowed to make all-out efforts to locate the missing" according to the Xinhua News Agency. Local residents feared the death toll could rise significantly as many people living in the area were undocumented migrant workers from other provinces. There has also been criticism over the effectiveness of the rescue effort, with one resident stating that it took an hour for rescue personnel to arrive in the area after the dam collapsed. Hospitals around the disaster area were reportedly overwhelmed with an influx of casualties stemming from the collapse, though no number was stated.

Authorities evacuated approximately 156,000 people in the province. At least three people were killed in the province and economic losses amounted to ¥3.28 billion (US$515 million). One person was also killed in Jiangsu Province. More than 145,000 people were relocated as homes became submerged in water. Flooding along the Wuhu-Guixi Railway line stranded 12 trains and trapped thousands of people. In one train, more than 1,000 people were trapped for 10 hours as repairs were conducted.

In the wake of widespread flooding brought about by the typhoon, the National Commission for Disaster Reduction and the Ministry of Civil Affairs activated level four emergency plans in Anhui, Jiangxi, Shanghai, and Zhejiang Provinces. Relief teams were dispatched to the four provinces to assist in relief efforts. In all, 6 people were killed, and total economic losses amounted to be CNY 37.09 billion (US$5.83 billion).

See also

2012 Philippines flooding
Other storms of the same name
Typhoon Ketsana
Typhoon Rananim
Typhoon Saomai 
Tropical Storm Trami (2013)
Tropical Storm Fung-wong (2014)
Typhoon Maria (2018)
Typhoon Lekima

References

External links

JMA General Information of Typhoon Haikui (1211) from Digital Typhoon
JMA Best Track Data of Typhoon Haikui (1211) 
JTWC Best Track Data of Typhoon 12W (Haikui)
12W.HAIKUI from the U.S. Naval Research Laboratory

2012 Pacific typhoon season
Typhoons in Japan
Typhoons in China
2012 in the Philippines
Typhoons in the Philippines
2012 in China
2012 in Japan
2012 disasters in the Philippines
2012 floods in Asia
Typhoons
Haikui